A femtosecond is a unit of time in the International System of Units (SI) equal to 10 or  of a second; that is, one quadrillionth, or one millionth of one billionth, of a second. For context, a femtosecond is to a second as a second is to about 31.71 million years; a ray of light travels approximately 0.3 μm (micrometers) in 1 femtosecond, a distance comparable to the diameter of a virus.

The word femtosecond is formed by the SI prefix femto and the SI unit second. Its symbol is fs.

A femtosecond is equal to 1000 attoseconds, or 1/1000 picosecond. Because the next higher SI unit is 1000 times larger, times of 10−14 and 10−13 seconds are typically expressed as tens or hundreds of femtoseconds.

 Typical time steps for molecular dynamics simulations are on the order of 1 fs.
 The periods of the waves of visible light have a duration of about 2 femtoseconds.  The precise duration depends on the energy of the photons, which determines their color. (See wave–particle duality.)  This time can be calculated by dividing the wavelength of the light by the speed of light (approximately 3×108 m/s) to determine the time required for light to travel that distance.

Examples
 46 fs – the swiftest chemical reaction known (radiolysis of water leads to the formation of a H2O+ ion, which rapidly reacts to become hydronium (H3O+) and a short lived hydrogen monoxide molecule (OH))
 200 fs – the average chemical reaction, such as the reaction of pigments in an eye to light
 300 fs – the duration of a vibration of the atoms in an iodine molecule

See also 
 Femtochemistry
 Femtosecond pulse shaping
 Ultrafast laser spectroscopy
 Mode-locking
 Microsecond
 Millisecond
 Nanosecond
 Orders of magnitude (time)
 Ahmed Zewail

References 

Orders of magnitude (time)

de:Sekunde#Abgeleitete Maßeinheiten
fr:1 E-15 s